Bravo All Stars were a pop supergroup formed in Hamburg, Germany and the United States in 1998.

History
"Let the Music Heal Your Soul" was released as a single by the Bravo All Stars on 18 May 1998. The band consisted of: Touché, The Boyz, The Moffatts, Scooter, Aaron Carter, the Backstreet Boys, Mr. President, Justin Timberlake, Sqeezer, Blümchen, R'n'G and Gil.
The idea behind it was conceived by Alex Christensen, to benefit charity to the Nordoff-Robbins Music Therapy Foundation. Each artist took turns singing two lines from each verse, while all of the singers sang the chorus together. "Let the Music Heal Your Soul" reached number 36 in the UK Singles Chart in August 1998. The song ranked number 73 on the 1998 year-end singles chart in Germany.

References

Pop music supergroups
Musical groups established in 1998
1998 establishments in Germany